Hyun Sook-hee (Hangul: 현숙희, Hanja: 玄淑姬; born March 3, 1973, in Seoul, South Korea) is a South Korean judoka.

Hyun won the silver medal in the half-lightweight division (-52 kg) at the 1996 Summer Olympics. She also won bronze at the 1997 World Judo Championships in Paris, France.

In 2002, she earned an international judo referee licence from International Judo Federation, and is currently serving as a judo coach for Kwangyoung Girl's High School in Seoul, Korea.

External links
Database Olympics

1973 births
Living people
People from Seoul
Sportspeople from Seoul
Judoka at the 1996 Summer Olympics
Olympic judoka of South Korea
Olympic silver medalists for South Korea
Olympic medalists in judo
Asian Games medalists in judo
Judoka at the 1994 Asian Games
Yong In University alumni
South Korean female judoka
Medalists at the 1996 Summer Olympics
Asian Games gold medalists for South Korea
Medalists at the 1994 Asian Games
Universiade medalists in judo
Universiade silver medalists for South Korea
Judo referees
20th-century South Korean women